Glyphoglossus yunnanensis, also known as Yunnan squat frog or Yunnan small narrow-mouthed frog, is a species of frog in the family Microhylidae.

Breeding takes place in pools and paddy fields. G. yunnanensis is common in China. It is threatened by habitat destruction and degradation caused by human settlements. Its range overlaps with many protected areas.

References

yunnanensis
Frogs of Asia
Frogs of China
Amphibians of Vietnam
Amphibians described in 1919
Taxa named by George Albert Boulenger
Taxonomy articles created by Polbot